Qiana Joseph (born 1 January 2001) is a Saint Lucian cricketer who plays for Windward Islands and Barbados Royals as a left-arm pace bowler. In May 2017, she was named in the West Indies squad for the 2017 Women's Cricket World Cup. She made her Women's One Day International (WODI) debut for the West Indies against South Africa in the 2017 Women's Cricket World Cup on 2 July 2017. In November 2018, she was named in the West Indies' squad replacing the injured Sheneta Grimmond for the 2018 ICC Women's World Twenty20 tournament in the West Indies.

In May 2021, Joseph was awarded with a central contract from Cricket West Indies. In June 2021, Joseph was named in the West Indies A Team for their series against Pakistan. In August 2021, Joseph was named in the West Indies' Women's Twenty20 International (WT20I) squad for their series against South Africa. Joseph made her WT20I debut on 31 August 2021, for the West Indies against South Africa.

In October 2021, she was named in the West Indies team for the 2021 Women's Cricket World Cup Qualifier tournament in Zimbabwe.

References

External links

2001 births
Living people
Saint Lucian women cricketers
West Indies women One Day International cricketers
West Indies women Twenty20 International cricketers
West Indian women cricketers
Windward Islands women cricketers
Barbados Royals (WCPL) cricketers